In mathematics, the Davenport constant  is an invariant of a group studied in additive combinatorics, quantifying the size of nonunique factorizations.  Given a finite abelian group ,  is defined as the smallest number such that every sequence of elements of that length contains a non-empty subsequence adding up to 0.  In symbols, this is

Example
To see this, note that the sequence of a fixed generator, repeated  times, contains no subsequence with sum . Thus . On the other hand, if  is an arbitrary sequence, then two of the sums in the sequence  are equal. The difference of these two sums also gives a subsequence with sum .

Properties
Then 

Then

Applications
The original motivation for studying Davenport's constant was the problem of non-unique factorization in number fields. Let  be the ring of integers in a number field,  its class group. This observation implies that Davenport's constant determines by how much the lengths of different factorization of some element in  can differ.

The upper bound mentioned above plays an important role in Ahlford, Granville and Pomerance's proof of the existence of infinitely many Carmichael numbers.

Variants

 Balandraud proved that  equals the smallest  such that . 
 For  we have 
.  

References

External links
 
 

Sumsets